This is a list of orthodox churches and monasteries in North Macedonia by diocese.

Diocese of Skopje

Northern Skopje

Southern Skopje

Diocese of Kumanovo and Osogovo

Diocese of Tetovo and Gostivar

Tetovo

Gostivar

Diocese of Debar and Kičevo

Diocese of Prespa and Pelagonija

Bitola

Prilep

Resen

Kruševo and Demir Hisar

Diocese of Strumica

Diocese of Bregalnica

Diocese of Povardarie

External links
MOC - Macedonian monasteries

References

North Macedonia
Churches